
Gmina Żyraków is a rural gmina (administrative district) in Dębica County, Subcarpathian Voivodeship, in southeastern Poland.

Villages
Gmina Żyraków contains the villages and settlements of Bobrowa, Bobrowa Wola, Góra Motyczna, Korzeniów, Mokre, Nagoszyn, Straszęcin, Wiewiórka, Wola Wielka, Wola Żyrakowska, Zasów, Zawierzbie and Żyraków.

Neighbouring gminas
Gmina Żyraków is bordered by the town of Dębica and by the gminas of Czarna, Dębica, Przecław and Radomyśl Wielki.

References
Polish official population figures 2006

Zyrakow
Dębica County